Lutfunnahar Helen (28 December 1947 – 5 October 1971) was a Bangladeshi educationist, political activist who was killed by Pakistan Army in Bangladesh Liberation War and is viewed as a "martyr" in the Bangladesh.

Early life
Helen was born on 28 December 1947 in Magura, East Bengal in the then Dominion of Pakistan. In 1965, she graduated from  Magura College and later graduated from Rajshahi University in 1968.

Career
Helen was a social activist. In 1962 while she was a student she participated in democracy protests against military dictator General Ayub Khan. She was the secretary of women affairs of the Students Union while she was in Magura College. She was also the vice-president of Magura subdivisional unit of East Pakistan Student union. After graduation from Rajshahi University in 1968 she joined Magura Girls' High School.

Bangladesh Liberation War
When the Bangladesh Liberation War started in 1971 she joined the war along with her brothers. Mukti Bahini members took over the camp of paramilitary Rajakar in Muhammadpur Thana, Magura, and turned it into a training camp, which Helen joined. She motivated local people to join the war and worked as an informant for the Mukti Bahini, informing them about the movements of Pakistani Army and Paramilitary soldiers. She worked to supply resources to Mukti Bahini and motivate girls to join the war effort.

Death and legacy
Helen was captured by a team of Rajakars in Muhammadpur Thana and handed over to Pakistan Army camp in Magura in September 1971. On 5 October 1971 she was killed by Pakistan Army soldiers. She was tied to an army jeep and dragged to a canal of Nabaganga River. Her body was not recovered. Bangladesh post office released stamps with her image on Martyred Intellectual Day on 14 December 1995.

References

1947 births
1971 deaths
University of Rajshahi alumni
People killed in the Bangladesh Liberation War
Mukti Bahini personnel
People from Magura District
Bangladeshi educators